Sint-Genesius-Rode is a municipality located in Flanders, one of three regions of Belgium, in the province of Flemish Brabant. The municipality comprises the town of Sint-Genesius-Rode only, and lies between Brussels and Waterloo in Wallonia. On January 1, 2008, the town had a total population of 18,021.

Politics 
The official language of the city is Dutch, historically the majority language of the population. However, Sint-Genesius-Rode is in linguistic flux, as it is one of the most evenly divided between the two languages. There is no linguistic census in Belgium, but based on the support Francophone parties receive, the French-speaking population of Sint-Genesius-Rode is estimated to be about 64%.

As in several other municipalities on the periphery of Brussels, in the 1960s linguistic facilities were given to local French-speaking residents. These mostly stemmed from Francophone workers employed in the neighbouring Brussels migrating to the area. These 'facilities' allow them the right to obtain and submit official documents from the local administration in French, as well as to conduct business with the authorities in the language of their choice. The regionalization of Belgium has maintained that compromise, though politicians representing French-speakers have interpreted these facilities as a permanent right for Francophones in the Brussels periphery. The Flemish viewpoint is that these facilities existed temporarily in order to assist those French-speakers who already had come to live there to help them integrate in the Flemish region and eventually learn the Dutch language. Nonetheless, the law states clearly that the facilities are not temporary.

Today, this particular municipality remains a controversial topic of local and national politics. On May 31, 2010, its city council voted a motion asking that it be reassigned from the Flemish Region to the Brussels Capital Region, in view of the majority of francophones residing there.  A considerable number of Belgian French-speakers would like this to happen, thus creating a geographical link between Wallonia and Brussels. Francophone politicians propose this in exchange of the Flemish demand for the splitting of Brussels-Halle-Vilvoorde. The reassignment of the area is strongly opposed by most Flemish people, their politicians and their institutions, who argue that the borders of Belgium's regions should not be changed simply because many people move from one region to another. They see the incorporation of the territory into the Brussels Capital Region as a threat to the language and cultural rights of Flemish residents, and that a precedent would be set that would invite further Francophone migration to other municipalities with facilities. They also view this tendency as the extension of an already prevalent Francophone influence on the capital region.

The current system of facilities was settled by Flemish politicians in 1963. A large majority of French speakers did not agree with this evolution. The previous system, also proposed by the Flemish politicians but accepted by the French speakers, relied on decennial census programs to adapt the limits of the linguistic regions. In 1930, the French speaking politicians strongly refused a Flemish proposal to make the whole Belgian territory fully bilingual, calling it unthinkable that French speaking officials would thus be supposed to learn Dutch.

Notable people
 Paul Loicq (1888–1953), president of the International Ice Hockey Federation
 Herman van Rompuy (born 1947), Belgian politician and President of the European Council

See also
 Municipalities with language facilities
 Von Karman Institute for Fluid Dynamics

References

External links
 
official website

 
Municipalities of Flemish Brabant